Daryl Sanders Jackson AO (born 7 February 1937) is an Australian architect and the owner of an international architecture firm, Jackson Architecture. Jackson also became an associate professor at University of Melbourne and Deakin University.

Early life, education, and career
Jackson was born on 7 February 1937 in Clunes, Victoria, Australia. He was educated at Wesley College in Melbourne and he graduated from Royal Melbourne Institute of Technology (RMIT) and the University of Melbourne with a Diploma of Architecture.

Jackson established his first practice with Evan Walker in 1965. Jackson Architecture Pty Ltd, located in Melbourne, Sydney, Canberra, Brisbane, London, Vietnam, and China, has completed a large catalogue of projects, including university and college facilities, stadiums, commercial offices, art galleries, and industrial structures. Some of his projects include the Immigration Museum, Melbourne and the County Court of Victoria.

Jackson's considerable teaching, writing, and lecturing has had a significant influence on the course of Australian architectural development. He taught architecture at RMIT and wrote a regular column on housing for The Age from 1966 to 1999. Jackson has also been a principal lecturer at Royal Australian Institute of Architects (RAIA) conventions and was a visiting professor of architecture and design at the University of New South Wales in 1982. With positions as Chairman of the Australian Film Institute, Trustee of the National Gallery of Victoria, Member of the Victorian Council of the Arts, Vice President of the Melbourne Cricket Club, Director of the Essendon Football Club, and President of Wesley College (Victoria), he has continually contributed to a heterogeneous notion of Australian culture.

Architectural style and practice
Jackson's architecture has evolved over forty years of professional practice. His first contribution to Australian architecture began with the Harold Holt Memorial Swimming Centre, which defined his early Brutalist architecture style.

Two buildings, Swinburne University Graduate School of Management and County Court of Victoria in central Melbourne, work their way into the iconic street grid to form hard-edge modernist figures on important street corners. The slicing "cut edge" profiling of the Court entrance portico is a gesture of urban affirmation that symbolises and emphasises a new presence.

Jackson's more recent projects, found in Australia and internationally, differ from one another because they reflect the attitudes, technologies, and vernacular of their respective localities.

Jackson Architecture
As the chief principal of design at Jackson Architecture, Jackson perceives his role relative to that of a film director: "working on the plot, lining up the cameras, producing and editing to generate the desired result". While Jackson unifies each product with his direct design input, he places a strong emphasis on collaborative design and idea thinking, and acknowledges the talent and co-professionalism of other designers that help piece together each project.

Daryl's Sydney practice, Daryl Jackson Robin Dyke Pty Ltd, is the Executive Architect for the University of Technology, Sydney (UTS) on the Frank Gehry-designed business school building. The Dr Chau Chak Wing Building was Gehry's first building in Australia with a design based on the idea of a tree-house structure. Construction started early 2012 with a view to be completed in time for the 2014 academic year.

Awards
 1981 – The first Australian architect to be awarded the Sir Zelman Cowen Award
 1987 – Royal Australian Institute of Architects Gold Medal
 1990 – Appointed an Officer of the Order of Australia on 26 January 1990 for his service to architecture

Award-winning projects
 1978  – Citation in Library Design Awards for Balwyn Library, Melbourne, Victoria.
 1998 –  RAIA Environment Award for Sunshine Coast University College, Science Faculty Building, Queensland.
 1999 –  RAIA Presidents Award for Recycled Buildings for the Immigration Museum and Hellenic Archaeological Museum, Melbourne, Victoria.
 2003 –  RAIA Interior Architecture Award for the County Court of Victoria, Melbourne Victoria.
 2010 –  RAIA Public Architecture Award RAIA (WA Chapter) Regional Commendation for the WA Basketball Centre (AK Reserve) (Peter Hunt Architects JV)
 2010 –  RAIA Colourbond Award for Steel Architecture
 RAIA –  (WA Chapter) Regional Commendation for the RWA Basketball Centre (AK Reserve) (Peter Hunt Architects JV)
 2010 –  Master Builders (WA) Excellence in Construction Award, Best State Government Building Commendation for the WA Basketball Centre (AK Reserve) (Peter Hunt Architects JV)
 2010 –  Master Builders (VIC) Excellence in Construction Award, Excellence in Commercial Buildings $10M-$15M for the Commendation VIC Ivanhoe Girls' Grammar School
 2010 –  Western Australian Heritage Award for the WA Police Midland Operations Support Facility, (Peter Hunt Architects JV)
2012 –  WAN Interior Awards (Residential) | Interiors Longlist, For Analogue Fitout
 2013 –  Excellence in Construction of Commercial Building for the Olivia Newton-John Cancer and Wellness Centre (Jackson Architecture and McConnel Smith Johnson)
2014 –  Master Builders (Victoria) Excellence in Commercial Construction, For Melbourne Park Eastern Precinct Redevelopment
2015 –  Design Is...Awards: Global Winner, For Monash International Bachelor of Business City Campus (In collaboration with JCB Architects)

Work
Jackson's projects are mostly found in Australia's four east coast capital cities: Melbourne, Sydney, Brisbane and Canberra. He also has work located in Shanghai, Qingdao, Hanoi, Berlin and London.

Notable works include:

Education projects
Princes Hill Secondary College 
Ivanhoe Girls' Grammar School Resource Centre
Sydney Conservatorium of Music
Redevelopment of the University of Ballarat
Redevelopment of the Wesley College – St. Kilda Road Campus Junior School (formerly known as the Preparatory School)
Swinburne University Graduate School of Business
The Snow Centre for Education in the Asian Century, Canberra Grammar School
University of Queensland Bioscience Precinct, University of Queensland
University of Victoria Victoria University Tower, Melbourne
University of Canterbury Canterbury Engineering the Future (CETF), University of Canterbury
University of Canterbury Gateway Building, Victoria University of Wellington, Wellington, New Zealand
James Cook University Australian Institute of Tropical Health and Medicine Townsville, QLD

Residential projects
Carlton Housing Redevelopment
Wuxi Housing Development, China
Elliston Estate, Rosanna
College Square Student Housing
Fitzroy Apartments, Fitzroy,

Health and research
Olivia Newton-John Cancer and Wellness Centre
Royal Prince Alfred Hospital redevelopment
Royal Brisbane and Women's Hospital redevelopment
Royal Melbourne Hospital redevelopment
Prince of Wales Hospital redevelopment
Royal Australasian College of Surgeons redevelopment
CSIRO Discovery Centre
Box Hill Hospital
Australian Nursing and Midwifery Federation

Sport and recreation
Telstra Dome
Brisbane Cricket Ground
Melbourne Cricket Ground Great Southern Stand
Melbourne Cricket Ground Northern Stand
Australian Institute of Sport Swimming Hall
Frankston Arts Centre
Melbourne Park Eastern Plazza
Maribyrnong, Victoria Maribyrnong Aquatic Centre
Essendon Football Club High Performance Facility

Commercial and retail
120 Collins Street, Melbourne
480 Lonsdale Street, Melbourne
European Serviced Offices, Budapest
Australian Greenhouse Office, Canberra
Brindabella Business Park, Canberra
Canberra Centre, Canberra

Government
3-5 National Circuit Attorney General's Department
County Court of Victoria
West Australian Police Academy
Impulse Airlines hangar at Canberra Airport
Capital Jet Facility at Canberra Airport

Master-planning
Bond University
Griffith University
University of Melbourne
Canberra Grammar School

References

External links
Jackson Architecture
Daryl Jackson Robin Dyke
Daryl Jackson Alistair Swayn

RMIT University alumni
1937 births
Living people
Officers of the Order of Australia
Recipients of the Royal Australian Institute of Architects’ Gold Medal
People educated at Wesley College (Victoria)
People from Clunes, Victoria